Hanuman Temple in Connaught Place, New Delhi, India, is an ancient Hindu temple and is claimed to be one of the five temples of Mahabharata days in Delhi. The other four temples are the Kalkaji, a Kali temple in South Delhi containing Swayambu (Sanskrit: "self manifest") rock Idol,  the Yogmaya Temple near Qutub Minar, the Bhairav temple near the Purana Qila and the Nili Chatri Mahadev (Shiva temple) at  Nigambodh Ghat outside the walls of Old Delhi.

The temple, which has a self manifest idol of Hanuman, has an unusual feature fixed in the spire (Shikhara) in the form of a crescent moon instead of the Hindu symbol of Aum or Sun that is commonly seen in most Hindu temples. This became particularly important during the Mughal period corroborating this extraordinary depiction.

The idol in the temple, devotionally worshipped as "Sri Hanuman Ji Maharaj" (Great Lord Hanuman), is that of Bala Hanuman namely, Hanuman as a child.

History

Historically, Delhi located on the banks of the Yamuna River has been stated to be the Indraprastha city built by Pandavas of the Mahabharata epic period. Pandavas ruled from Indraprastha and Kauravas from Hastinapur (two collateral families) as per a brokered partition of the Kuru empire. But, in a dice game, Pandavas lost their Kingdom and were exiled for a 12-year term and in the 13th year must remain in hiding (with a rider that if they were detected during this period they would undergo the exile denovo). Mythological legend states that during the Pandavas' exile (imposed by their cousin Duryodhana of the Kaurava dynasty), in order to subdue Bhima’s (second of the  five Pandava brothers) arrogance, Hanuman considered to be the brother of Bhima (both Vayu's children, appeared in the forest disguised as a weak and aged monkey.  Bhima, while in search of a fragrant flower sought by Draupadi in the forest, found Hanuman lying with his tail blocking his way and, unaware of Hanuman's identity, scornfully asked him to remove his tail. But Hanuman told Bhima to lift the tail since being old he was unable to do it on his own. Bhima tried hard several times but failed to lift it, in spite of being a man of great strength. Bhima then realized that the monkey was none other his own brother, apologizes for his arrogant behavior and requests Hanuman to show him his true form. Hanuman was then said to have enlarged himself and showed Bhima the size in which he had crossed the sea to go to Lanka, looking for Maa Sita Ji during the Ramayana epic period. After the Pandavas won the Kurukshetra war against the Kauravas and re–established themselves in Indraprastha, the Pandava clan is stated to have built five temples of Hanuman and other deities.

It is believed that Tulsidas (1532–1623), who wrote Ramacharitamanas (popularly known as Tulsi Ramayan and penned the famous Hanuman Chalisa hymns in praise of Hanuman, visited this temple in Delhi. During his visit to Delhi, Tulsidas was summoned by the Mughal Emperor and asked to perform a miracle, which he did with the blessings of Lord Hanuman. The Emperor was pleased with Tulsidas and presented the Hanuman temple with an Islamic crescent Moon finial which adorns the temple spire. It is also claimed that because of the crescent moon symbol on the spire, the temple was not destroyed by the Muslim rulers who invaded India at various times.

Reportedly, it was built originally by Maharaja Man Singh I of Amber (1540–1614) during Emperor Akbar’s (1542-1605) reign. It was reconstructed by Maharaja Jai Singh (1688-1743) in 1724, around the same time as the Jantar Mantar. After that the temple has undergone many improvements making it a notable religious centre in the heart of Central Delhi.

An important feature of the worship at this temple is the 24–hour chanting of the mantra (hymn) "Sri Ram, Jai Ram, Jai Jai Ram", since 1 August 1964. It is claimed that this continuous chanting has been recorded in the Guinness Book of World Records.

Temple features

Entry to the temple is through the Baba Kharak Singh Marg (Road). The approach is through a set of marble steps from the road level leading into the main foyer of the temple through massive silver-plated doors, which are engraved with scenes of the epic Ramayana story. The foyer is ventilated with clerestory windows that are adorned with paintings of Hanuman in the cardinal directions depicting his four aspects. Below each Hanuman painting, the full text of Tulsidas's Sundar Kand is inscribed on the marble tablets affixed on the walls. The Sanctum Sanctorum, which houses the Hanuman idol, is on the north wall on the right side of the entry foyer (pictured), with the idol facing the southern direction in a small bas-relief  carving (pictured). Images of Radha and Krishna, a central triumvirate of Rama, Lakshmana and Sita are also installed to the right of the Hanuman idol on the same wall.

As the idol of Hanuman faces the southern direction, devotees can discern only one eye of the idol.  The idol depicts a Gada (mace or club) in the left hand with the right hand crossed across the chest showing veneration to the adjacent idol of lord Rama, Lakshmana and Sita. A tapering crown adorns the idol, which has a sacred thread on the right shoulder and is clad in a fashioned  dhoti. The height of the temple is reported to be . The ceiling of the main mandap (hall or pavilion) depicts the epic story of Ramayana artistically painted. In recent years, the New Delhi Municipal Corporation (NDMC) has enhanced the religious character of the temple precincts by incorporating within the main complex a shrine to Shiva, Parvati and their children, of the same size as the adjoining main sanctum, another enclosure housing idols of Durga, Lakshmi Narayan and Ganesha and on the south in an annex the idol of goddess Santoshi Mata (the wish fulfilling goddess). The last named deity has created a cult culture among women with Friday worship that was propagated by the religious feature film Jai Santoshi Ma, since 1975.

Visitor information
Tuesday and Saturday are special days of worship when devotees congregate at the temple in large numbers. Hanuman Jayanti (birthday celebrations of lord Hanuman) is held every year with great fanfare on the full moon (Purnima) day in the month of Chaitra (March – April) as per established lunar Hindu Panchangam or Hindu calendar. Colourful processions with festoons and with devotees wearing Hanuman masks and tails and carrying large idols of Hanuman fill the streets. Commercial establishments within the temple complex sell religious offerings and bangles made of lac and plastic. It is also a popular place for women for Mehndi (temporary henna tattoos).

This temple is well connected by road as well as Delhi Metro. Shivaji stadium is the nearest bus stand and also has Airport Express Metro Line nearby and Rajeev Chowk is the nearest metro station.

Gallery

References

External links

Obama gets Hanuman's blessing Video Reuters.com

Hanuman temples
Hindu temples in Delhi
1724 establishments in India